The Conservatives gained seats to strengthen their position controlling the council. After the election, the composition of the council was:-
 Conservative 25
 Labour 20

Election result

Ward results
Percentage change in party votes are from the last time the ward was contested. This is either 2015 or 2016.

Alfreton

Belper East

Belper South

Codnor and Waingroves

Duffield

Heanor and Loscoe

Heanor East

Heanor West

Ironville and Riddings

Kilburn, Denby and Holbrook

Langley Mill and Aldercar

Ripley

Shipley Park, Horsley and Horsley Woodhouse

Somercotes

Swanwick

References

2018 English local elections
2018
2010s in Derbyshire